J.D. Women's College (Janki Devi Women's College), established in 1971, is a general degree women's colleges in Patna, Bihar, India. It is a constituent unit of Patliputra University. The college offers undergraduate courses in science, arts as well as vocational courses (BCA, BBM).

Departments
The college offers undergraduate academic courses in the following disciplines.

Science

Chemistry
Physics 
Mathematics
Zoology
Botany

Arts 

English
Hindi
Bengali
Urdu
Sanskrit
Economics
Political Science
Philosophy
Psychology
History
Sociology
Home Science
Music
Geography
BCA Department
BBM Department

Accreditation
J.D. Women's College was accredited Grade 'B' by the National Assessment and Accreditation Council.

References

External links
Official Website

Universities and colleges in Bihar
Educational institutions established in 1971
Universities and colleges in Patna
Constituent colleges of Patliputra University
1971 establishments in Bihar